Kuhnab (also Romanized as Kūhnāb and Koohnab; also known as Gaveh Now, Gav Now, Gūhnāb, Keyvānī, Kiavani, and Kyavany) is a village in Dowlatabad Rural District, in the Central District of Marand County, East Azerbaijan Province, Iran. At the 2006 census, its population was 188, in 51 families.

References 

Populated places in Marand County